Parliamentary elections were held in Madagascar on 28 May 1989. Only parties affiliated with the AREMA-dominated National Front for the Defense of the Revolution were allowed to compete in the election, and AREMA won 120 of the 137 seats.

Voter turnout was 74.60% of the 5,741,974 registered voters.

Results

References

Elections in Madagascar

Parliamentary election
Madagascar
Malagasy parliamentary election